Aray Bridge, also known as Inveraray Bridge, is a stone two-arch public road bridge on the Inveraray Castle estate near Inveraray in Argyll and Bute, Scotland, carrying the A83 road over the mouth of the River Aray where it flows into Loch Fyne.

History
The present structure replaces a military bridge of 1758 designed by John Adam which was destroyed by floods in 1772. It was planned in 1773 by Robert Mylne for the Board of Ordnance and Colonel John Campbell, 5th Duke of Argyll, on whose estate it stands. The contractor was J. Brown and it was completed in 1775/6.

It was placed at Category A (the highest) on Historic Scotland's listed building designations in 1971. The Arrochar trunk road over the bridge now operates as a single carriageway controlled by traffic lights.

Description
The bridge consists of two equal segmental arch spans of  built of rubble with all faces of dressed masonry and partly balustraded parapets; the central spandrel is pierced and the pier is angular.

References

Bridges in Argyll and Bute
Road bridges in Scotland
Bridges completed in 1776
Category A listed buildings in Argyll and Bute
Listed bridges in Scotland
1776 establishments in Scotland